The Wolf is the third studio album by Shooter Jennings, released in 2007 on the Universal South Records label. Two singles were released from it: a cover of Dire Straits' "Walk of Life" and "This Ol' Wheel". A music video was also made for the single "Walk of Life".

Track listing

Personnel
Shooter Jennings - drum loops, acoustic guitar, electric guitar, keyboards, sound effects, lead vocals, backing vocals
Duane Allen - backing vocals on "Slow Train"
Norah Lee Allen - backing vocals 
Jon Bonsall - backing vocals on "Slow Train"
William Lee Golden - backing vocals on "Slow Train"
Steve Herrman - trumpet
Jim Horn - saxophone, horn arrangements
Ted Russell Kamp - bass guitar, keyboards, backing vocals
Bryan Keeling - castanets, drums, percussion
Doug Kershaw - fiddle on "This Ol' Wheel"
Paul Martin - backing vocals
Gary Murray - banjo, fiddle
Leroy Powell - 12-string guitar, acoustic guitar, electric guitar, pedal steel guitar, harmonica, slide guitar, backing vocals
Charles Rose - trombone
Kevin Sciou - electric guitar
Calvin Settles - backing vocals
Odessa Settles - backing vocals
Sara Settles - backing vocals 
Shirley Settles - backing vocals
Richard Sterban - backing vocals on "Slow Train"
Todd Suttles - backing vocals
Teresa Wilson - backing vocals

Charts

References

2007 albums
Shooter Jennings albums
Show Dog-Universal Music albums
Albums produced by Dave Cobb